is a railway station in Kōtō, Tokyo, Japan, operated by East Japan Railway Company (JR East) and the private railway operator Tobu Railway.

Lines

Station layout

JR East platforms

Tobu platforms
This station consists of an island platform serving two tracks.

History
The JR station (originally on the Sōbu Railway) opened on December 1, 1894. The Tobu Kameido Line station opened on April 5, 1904.

Surrounding area
 Kameido Tenjinja Shrine
 Yomiuri College of Car Mechanics

References

External links

 JR East station information 
 Tobu station information 

Railway stations in Japan opened in 1894
Stations of East Japan Railway Company
Sōbu Main Line
Chūō-Sōbu Line
Stations of Tobu Railway
Railway stations in Tokyo